Gabrius is a genus of beetles belonging to the family Staphylinidae.

The genus has cosmopolitan distribution.

Species:
 Gabrius abas Smetana, 1984 
 Gabrius aberdarensis (Bernhauer, 1939)

References

Staphylinidae
Staphylinidae genera